The ASEAN European Academic University Network (ASEA-UNINET) is a network of universities, consisting of European and south-east Asian universities. It was founded in 1994 by universities from Austria, Indonesia, Thailand and Vietnam with the goal of promoting the continuous internationalisation of education and research. Today ASEA-UNINET consists of 83 universities from 17 different countries.

The Beginnings & Aims 
The foundations for this university network were laid by informal contacts between the University of Innsbruck and various Thai Universities, which date back to the late 1970s. Official visits followed and in the 1980s first partnerships between individual universities were concluded. This included partnership agreements between the University of Innsbruck and the Universities Chulalongkorn and Mahidol in Bangkok, as well as between the Universities of Vienna and Chiang Mai, and between the University of Agricultural Sciences in Vienna and the University of Kasetsart in Bangkok. Another partnership agreement was concluded with Gadjah Mada University in Yogyakarta in 1990. In 1992 the Universities of Innsbruck, Chulalongkorn, Vienna and Chiang Mai signed a joined partnership agreement to include one another in their cooperations. University relations also developed substantially with Vietnam. Furthermore interconnections were established between Austria's partner institutions in Thailand and other countries in the region and thus the idea of ASEA-UNINET was born.

With the aim to unify all these bilateral partnership agreements in one multilateral partnership, the initiator, Prof. Bernd Michael Rode, invited interested universities in Austria, Indonesia, Thailand and Vietnam to participate in the 1st Plenary Meeting in Ho Chi Minh City in December 1994. During this meeting the infrastructure and organization of the newly founded network, was laid down jointly by the participants and the following aims were agreed upon:
 facilitate and encourage cooperation between academic institutions in the fields of teaching, research, staff and student (e.g. joint research projects, staff and student exchange possibilities, Graduate programmes (mainly Ph.D. studies) and postgraduate education, specialized training courses).
 promotion of scientific, cultural and human relations and personal contacts. 
 promotion and initiation of projects of mutual interest and benefit for faculties, staff and students.
 Support and assist in forming coalitions of resources for academic activities between member institutions.
 facilitate collaboration and cooperation in education between universities, governmental and non-governmental organisations and economic operators engaged in projects related to education, science, technology and art in countries with member universities.
 act as a forum of continuous discussions on the progress of these projects, and serving as a network of excellence providing expertise and initiatives for entities seeking European-S.E.Asian relations.

Organization 
Each Member University has an ASEA-UNINET Coordinator, each country a National Coordinator and each continent a Regional Coordinator. The Chairman is elected at the General Assembly for approx. a 1 ½ year period.

In order to achieve ASEA UNINET's common goals and objectives financing is sought by all member institutions from university and national government sources. Project contributions are made by the member-universities on the basis of fair balance according to their economic and financial situation. Additional financial support is sought from regional (e.g. EU, ASEAN) as well as international agencies and from the private sector according to available projects.

Focal Areas 
Almost all areas of academic and economic interest are represented within ASEA-UNINET. The current focus areas of cooperation include:
 Science and Technology
 Economic and Social Sciences
 Health, Pharmacy and Medicine
 Humanities, Culture and Music

Members 
In 1994 this network consisted of 25 universities from Austria, Thailand, Indonesia and Vietnam. In the following years, many universities from the following countries have joined the network: Kingdom of Cambodia, Czech Republic, Germany, Greece, Italy, Malaysia, Myanmar, Philippines, Portugal, Slovakia, Spain. Pakistan and Iran have currently an associated status for specific projects. Since February 2018 ASEA-UNINET consists of 83 Universities from 17 different countries.

External links 
Austrian Foreign Ministry: Bilateral Relations Austria & Thailand Bilaterale Beziehungen mit Thailand, retrieved on May, 23rd 2014.
ASEA-UNINET Homepage, retrieved on May, 23rd 2014.
APA - Austrian Press Agency: "Beatrix Karl, Federal Minister of Science and Research meets in Bangkok with Thai Minister of Education and ASEA UNINET coordinators". Vienna February 14, 2011. Retrieved on May, 23rd 2014.
 University of Vienna: International Office:University of Vienna: International Office: ASEA UNINET, retrieved on July, 9th 2014.
University of Graz: University of Graz: ASEA UNINET, retrieved on July, 9th 2014.
Asian Studies, retrieved on July, 9th 2014.

References 

International college and university associations and consortia